Pope Adeodatus II (c. 621–17 June 676), sometimes called Deodatus, was the bishop of Rome from 672 to his death. He devoted much of his papacy to improving churches and fighting Monothelism.

Rise
Born in Rome in c. 621, Adeodatus was the son of a man named Jovinianus. He became a Benedictine monk of the Roman cloister of St Erasmus on the Caelian Hill. He became Pope on 11 April 672 in succession to Vitalian. His election was ratified by the exarch of Ravenna within weeks, as required during the period of Byzantine papacy. At the time, he was already an old man.

Pontificate
Adeodatus II's pontificate is extremely obscure. It coincided with a surge of passionate interest in Pope Martin I and Maximus the Confessor, who were known for resisting the support of the Eastern Roman emperors for Monothelism. In light of this, Pope Adeodatus rejected the 
synodical letters sent to him by Patriarch Constantine I of Constantinople. Because of this, his name was excluded from the diptychs in Constantinople. Adeodatus was active in improving monastic discipline and in the repression of Monothelitism and gave Venice the right to choose its doge. During his pontificate, the basilica of St. Pietro was built at the eight milestone of Via Portuense. St Erasmus was also reconstructed. Elected as Pope on 11 April 672, Adeodatus II did not get involved in political events and disengaged himself from the events at the time surrounding Monothelitism.

Pope Adeodatus II devoted his reign to the restoration of churches in disrepair. He protected the Abbey of St. Peter and St. Paul (known as St. Augustine's Abbey), exempted Marmoutier Abbey, Tours (Abbey of St. Martin of Tours) from the authority of the Holy See, and led improvements to St. Erasmus' monastery. He is sometimes called saint and 26 June is given as his feast day, but this is disputed. Adeodatus II's papacy did not contribute by a large amount to society. He died on 17 June 676 and was succeeded by Donus.

Notes

References
 

676 deaths
Papal saints
Italian popes
Popes of the Byzantine Papacy
7th-century archbishops
7th-century Christian saints
Benedictine popes
Italian Benedictines
Popes
7th-century popes
621 births
Burials at St. Peter's Basilica